Pers may refer to:

 Pers, Cantal, France, a commune near Aurillac 
 Pers, Deux-Sèvres, France, a commune near Poitiers 
 Pers., taxonomic author abbreviation for mycologist Christiaan Hendrik Persoon
Persian language

PERS may refer to:
 Personal Emergency Response System

See also
 
 
 Person (disambiguation)
 Perse (disambiguation)
 Per (disambiguation)